This is a list of television programs formerly and currently broadcast by the cable television channel TBS in the United States.

Current programming

Original programming

Comedy
Miracle Workers (2019)

Animation
American Dad! (2014; moved from Fox, shared with Adult Swim)

Unscripted

Game show
The Cube (2021)
Wipeout (2021; moved from ABC)

Reality 
Go-Big Show (2021)
 Power Slap: Road to the Title (2023)

Movie presentation
Friday Night Vibes (2021)

Sports
Major League Baseball on TBS (2008)
NCAA Division I men's basketball tournament (2011)
ELeague (2016)
NBA All-Star Game (TNT simulcast, 2015–present; Players-only feed, 2019)
AEW Dynamite (2022; moved from TNT)
NHL on TBS (2022; Stanley Cup playoffs)

Acquired programming

Comedy
Family Matters (1995–2003; 2020)
Friends (2001) (also airs on Nick at Nite)
The Big Bang Theory (2011)
2 Broke Girls (2015)
George Lopez (2020)
Young Sheldon (2021)
Silicon Valley (2023)

Animation
Bob's Burgers (2016; leaving in 2023) (also airs on FXX)

Unscripted
Wipeout (2008 version) (2013–14; 2020) also airs on TeenNick
Impractical Jokers (2019; truTV simulcast for new episodes, 2023)

Upcoming programming

Original programming

Unscripted

Docuseries
 AEW: All Access (March 29, 2023)

Game show
Rolling In It (TBA)

Reality
Average Joe (TBA)
Ultimate Slip 'N Slide (TBA)

Variety
Stupid Pet Tricks (TBA)

Former programming

Original programming

Comedy
Down to Earth (1984–87)
Rocky Road (1984–87)
Safe at Home (1985–89)
The New Leave It to Beaver (1986–89)
The Chimp Channel (1999)
10 Items or Less (2006–09)
My Boys (2006–10)
Tyler Perry's House of Payne (2006–12; moved to BET)
The Bill Engvall Show (2007–09)
Meet the Browns (2009–11)
Are We There Yet? (2010–13)
Glory Daze (2010–11)
Tyler Perry's For Better or Worse (2011–12; moved to OWN)
Men at Work (2012–14)
Sullivan & Son (2012–14)
Wedding Band (2012–13)
Cougar Town (2013–15; moved from ABC)
Ground Floor (2013–15)
Clipped (2015)
Meet the Smiths (2015)
Your Family or Mine (2015)
Angie Tribeca (2016–18)
People of Earth (2016–17)
Search Party (2016–17; moved to HBO Max)
The Detour (2016–19)
Wrecked (2016–18)
The Guest Book (2017–18)
The Last O.G. (2018–21)
Chad (2021; moved to The Roku Channel)

Animation
Neighbors from Hell (2010)
Tarantula (2017)
Final Space (2018–21; alongside Adult Swim)
Close Enough (2021–22; alongside HBO Max)

Reality
Court TV: Inside America's Courts (1995–96)
Ripley's Believe It or Not! (2000–03)
Worst Case Scenarios (2002)
House Rules (2003)
He's a Lady (2004)
The Mansion (2004)
The Real Gilligan's Island (2004–05)
Daisy Does America (2005–06)
Minding the Store (2005)
Frank TV (2007–08)
Deal With It (2013–14)
Deon Cole's Black Box (2013)
King of the Nerds (2013–15)
CeeLo Green's The Good Life (2014)
Funniest Wins (2014)
Funny or Die Presents: America's Next Weatherman (2015)
America's Greatest Makers (2016)
Drop the Mic (2017–18)
The Sims Spark'd (2020)
Tournament of Laughs (2020)
Lost Resort (2020)
Celebrity Show-Off (2020)
Harry Potter: Hogwarts Tournament of Houses (2021)
Rat in the Kitchen (2022)

Late night
Tush (1980–81)
Lopez Tonight (2009–11)
Conan (2010–21)
The Pete Holmes Show (2013–14)
Full Frontal with Samantha Bee (2016–22)

Game show
Starcade (1982–84)
Trust Me, I'm a Game Show Host (2013)
Who Gets the Last Laugh? (2013)
Bam's Bad Ass Game Show (2014)
Separation Anxiety (2016)
The Joker's Wild (2017–19)
The Misery Index (2019–21)

News/information
17 Update Early in the Morning (1976–79)
TBS Evening News (1980–84)
Good News (1983–91)
Between the Lines (1991–94)
Feed Your Mind (1994–98)

Children
Superstation Funtime (1980–86)
Kid's Beat (1983–96)
Captain Planet and the Planeteers (1990–97)
2 Stupid Dogs/Super Secret Squirrel (1993–95)
SWAT Kats: The Radical Squadron (1993–95)
Cartoon Planet (1995–96)
The Real Adventures of Jonny Quest (1996–97)

Soap opera
The Catlins (1983–85)

Other programming
Nice People (1981–83)
Night Tracks (1983–92)
Portrait of America (1983–88)
National Geographic Explorer (1986–99)
Portrait of the Soviet Union (1988)
Live from the House of Blues (1995–96)
Wild! Life Adventures (1997–2000)
The Megan Mullally Show (2006–07)

Syndicated repeats

Live-action

12 Dates of Christmas (2021)
9 to 5 (1988–89)
According to Jim (2009–13)
The Addams Family (1976–78; 1981–92)
The Adventures of Ozzie and Harriet (1981–82)
Alice (1987–89)
All in the Family (1979–86; 1988–93)
Amen (1997–2002)
America's Funniest Home Videos (1995–98; 2014–17)
America's Funniest People (1998–2003)
The Andy Griffith Show (1976–99)
The Baseball Bunch (1980–85)
Battlebots (2022)
Battle of the Planets (1984)
Becker (2005–06)
The Beverly Hillbillies (1976–99)
Bewitched (1982–97)
Big Trick Energy (2021)
Billy on the Street (2016–17)
The Bob Newhart Show (1979–87; 1991)
Bonanza (1986–95)
Bosom Buddies (2002–06)
The Brady Bunch (1980–86; 1988–97)
Brooklyn Nine-Nine (2018–21)
Carol Burnett & Friends (1978–89)
Charles in Charge (1994; 1996; 1998)
Childrens Hospital (2014)
CHiPs (1988–2004)
Cimarron Strip (1985–87)
Claws (2019)
Coach (1997–2002)
Cosby (2000–05)
The Cosby Show (1999–2008)
Dawson's Creek (2003–08)
A Different World (1999–2002)
Discovery (1978–79)
Dragnet (1978–80)
The Drew Carey Show (2002–07)
Ed (2004–05)
Empty Nest (1996)
Everybody Loves Raymond (2004–21) 
Family Affair (1976–77, 1980–81)
Family Ties (1996–2001)
Father Knows Best (1976–86; 1988)
The Flight Attendant (2020; 2022)
The Fresh Prince of Bel-Air (1999–2004; 2007–14)
Full House (1998–2002, 2013–16)
Get Smart (1976–77, 1984–90)
Gigglesnort Hotel (1979–80)
Gilligan's Island (1976–81; 1986–87; 1989–2002)
Gomer Pyle, USMC (1976–99)
Good Times (1989–92; 2000–02)
Green Acres (1978–83; 1985–89)
Growing Pains (1993–96)
Gunsmoke (1986–92)
Happy Days (1990–95)
Hazel (1976–86)
Head of the Class (1993, 1996)
Headline News (1983–98)
Heckle and Jeckle (1983–85)
The High Chaparral (1983–87)
Hogan's Heroes (1976–92)
Home Improvement (2002–13)
The Honeymooners (1986–93)
Hunter (1998–2002)
I Dream of Jeannie (1978–87; 1991–93)
I Love Lucy (1976–81; 1983–87; 1990–93)
Impractical Jokers (2019–22)
It Is Written (1980–96)
The Jeff Foxworthy Show (2012–14)
The Jeffersons (1989–95)
Just Shoot Me! (2007–10)
The King of Queens (2006–19)
Lassie (1976–78)
Laverne & Shirley (1987–98)
Leave It to Beaver (1976–97)
Little House on the Prairie (1983–2003)
The Little Rascals (1976–80)
Lois and Clark: The New Adventures of Superman (2003)
Lost in Space (1976–83)
Love, American Style (1976–81)
Love Life (2021–22)
The Lucy Show (1976–80; 1984–88)
Mama's Family (1997–2006)
Married... with Children (2008–18)
The Mary Tyler Moore Show (1985–87; 1991–92)
Matlock (1993–2003)
Maude (1992)
Maverick (1978–81)
The Mickey Mouse Club (1977–79)
Mission Impossible (1976–77, 1982–83)
The Monkees (1976–78)
Mr. Show with Bob and David (2004–07)
The Munsters (1978; 1981–95)
My Name is Earl (2008–14)
My Three Sons (1977–83; 1990–91)
New Girl (2015–22)
The New Howdy Doody Show (1976–77)
NewsRadio (2006–07)
Night Gallery (1980–81)
The Office (2007–15)
One Day at a Time (1988–92)
The Parent 'Hood (2002–07)
The Partridge Family (1976–82; 1984)
Perry Mason (1976–99)
The Rat Patrol (1979–85)
Rebop (1980–81)
Romper Room (1976–84)
Roseanne (1998–2003)
Rules of Engagement (2013–16)
Sanford and Son (1978–93)
Saved by the Bell (1992–2012)
Saved by the Bell: The College Years (1994–2012)
Seinfeld (2002–21)
Sex and the City (2004–10)
Spectreman (1978–80)
Star Trek (1976–79)
Tacoma FD (2019–20)
The Steve Harvey Show (2003–08)
Texas (early 1980s)
That Girl (1982–83)
The Three Stooges (1979–95)
Three's Company (1992–99)
Too Close for Comfort (1991)
Ultraman (1976–80)
The Untouchables (1980–81)
Vegetable Soup (1979–83)
Who's the Boss? (1994–1997)
World of Audubon (1984–96)
World's Funniest Videos (1999–2003)
The World Tomorrow (1983–94)
Yes, Dear (2004–12)

Animation
The Alvin Show (1985–86; 1987)
The Archie Show (1976–78)
The Banana Splits (1979)
The Cleveland Show (2013–18)
Baby Blues (2004-05)
Dexter's Laboratory (1996–97)
The Flintstones (1976–98)
Futurama (2003–07)
Family Guy (2003–21)
Garfield and Friends (1995–97)
Harley Quinn (2019)
The Jetsons (1992–98)
Looney Tunes (1980–98)
Mission Hill (2004–08)
The Oblongs (2004–06; 2013-2015)
Popeye (1980–95)
Rick and Morty (2015; 2021)
Robot Chicken (2014)
Scooby-Doo (1986–89; 1994–98)
Space Ghost Coast to Coast/What a Cartoon! (February 20, 1995)
The Space Giants (1978–81)
Speed Racer (1976–78)
Taz-Mania (1996–97)
Tom and Jerry (1986–97)
Tom and Jerry Kids (1994–95)
Tuca & Bertie (2021)
Yo, Yogi! (1992–93)
Yogi and Friends (1993–94)

Former movie presentations
Dinner and a Movie (1995–2010)

Sports programming
WCW Saturday Night (1972–2000)
Braves TBS Baseball (1973–2007)
College Football on TBS (1982–2006)
NASCAR on TBS (1983–2000)
Championship Wrestling from Georgia (1984–85)
NBA on TBS (1984–2002)
Mid-South Wrestling (1985)
WCW Pro (1985–98)
WCW Main Event (1988–98)
WCW Thunder (1998–2001)
NCAA Beach Volleyball Championship (2016–17)
U.S. Olympic Gold (1989–92)

See also
List of programs broadcast by TNT (American TV network)
List of programs broadcast by TruTV
List of programs broadcast by HGTV

References 

 
TBS